A police and crime commissioner (PCC) is an elected official in England and Wales responsible for generally overseeing police forces. A police, fire and crime commissioner (PFCC) is an elected official in England responsible for generally overseeing both police forces and fire services. Commissioners replaced now-abolished police authorities. The first incumbents were elected on 15 November 2012.

Background
In the 2010 general election campaign, the manifestos of the Conservatives and Liberal Democrats outlined plans, respectively, to replace or reform the existing police authorities. Following the election, the Conservative–Liberal Democrat coalition agreement of 2010 set out that:

Later in 2010, the government published 'Policing in the 21st Century', a consultation on its vision for policing, including the introduction of police and crime commissioners. This was followed by the Police Reform and Social Responsibility Act 2011. The Home Secretary, Theresa May, made the Policing Protocol Order in November 2011, which stated:The establishment of PCCs has allowed for the Home Office to withdraw from day-to-day policing matters, giving the police greater freedom to fight crime as they see fit, and allowing local communities to hold the police to account.
The Association of Police and Crime Commissioners was commissioned by the Home Office to facilitate co-ordination, representation and support for police and crime commissioners and police governance bodies from November 2012. The Association of Police and Crime Commissioners (APCC) represents all 40 PCCs as of April 2021.

Role and functions

The core functions of a PCC is to secure the maintenance of an efficient and effective police force within their area, and to hold the chief constable to account for the delivery of the police and crime plan. Police and crime commissioners are charged with holding the police fund (from which all policing of the area is financed) and raising the local policing precept from council tax. Police and crime commissioners are also responsible for the appointment, suspension and dismissal of the Chief Constable, although the 2011 Policing Protocol Order states that the PCC "must not fetter the operational independence of the police force and the Chief Constable who leads it". PCCs are able to appoint a Deputy PCC.

Police and crime plans
Shortly after their election to office, a PCC must produce a "police and crime plan". That plan must include his or her objectives for policing, what resources will be provided to the chief constable and how performance will be measured. Both the PCC and the chief constable must have regard to the police and crime plan in the exercise of their duties. The PCC is required to produce an annual report to the public on progress in policing.

Police funding
Police and crime commissioners hold the 'police fund', from which all policing is financed. The bulk of funding for the police fund comes from the Home Office in the form of an annual grant (calculated on a proportionate basis to take into account the differences between the 43 forces in England and Wales, which vary significantly in terms of population, geographical size, crime levels and trends), though commissioners will also set a precept on the council tax to raise additional funds. If a PCC wishes to increase the precept by an amount deemed to be excessive, the Localism Act 2011 requires a referendum. It is the PCC's responsibility to set the budget for the force area, which includes allocating enough money from the overall policing budget to ensure that the commissioner can discharge their functions effectively.

Proposed extension of powers
In September 2015, the government undertook a consultation into proposals which would bring England's fire services under the control of PCCs. Currently, there are four Police, Fire and Crime Commissioners. These are for Essex, Staffordshire, North Yorkshire and Northamptonshire.

Police and crime panels
The Police Reform and Social Responsibility Act 2011 established police and crime panels within each force area in England and Wales (excluding Greater London). These panels consist of at least one representative from each local authority in that area, and at least two independent members co-opted by the panel.

Panels are responsible for scrutinising PCC decisions and ensuring this information is available to the public. They must review the PCC's draft police and crime plan and draft annual report before publication, and the PCC must give their comments due consideration. A police and crime panel may require the attendance of the commissioner or a staff member at any time, and may suspend a PCC from office who is charged with a serious criminal offence. Police and crime panels will be able to veto a PCC's proposed precept or proposed candidate for Chief Constable by a two-thirds majority.

A National Audit Office report published in January 2014 found that there were "few checks and balances" on the 41 PCCs between elections. It said police and crime panels, which were set up to scrutinise PCCs, "lack powers" to act on the information they receive.

Oath of impartiality
On 16 August 2012, the Home Office announced that every newly elected police and crime commissioner would be required to swear an "oath of impartiality" before taking office. The oath reads:

The then Minister for Policing and Criminal Justice, Nick Herbert said:

The Association of Police and Crime Commissioners, set up to act as an "umbrella body" for the elected PCCs, revealed that it had been asked by the Home Office to "seek views from police authorities and prospective candidates on the wording of the oath". By the time the first police and crime commissioner had been elected, in November 2012, the original Home Office text of the "Oath of Impartiality" had been significantly modified. As an example, this is the amended oath as delivered by the police and crime commissioner for Avon and Somerset:

In South Wales, the title "Oath of Impartiality" was replaced by the term "Oath of Office" on the PCC's website with no mention of "impartiality". In other police areas, like Thames Valley, the PCC's website describes it simply as "The Oath".

The written form of the oath which is signed by all PCCs on taking office is not headed "Oath of Impartiality" but "Declaration of Acceptance of Office".

Eligibility for election
Candidates must be 18 or over and registered to vote within the police area on the date of nomination. Members of the House of Lords are not barred from standing. Members of the House of Commons are not barred from standing but, if they win, they must resign before they can take up a PCC appointment.

Those disqualified from standing or continuing to hold office include:

 Anyone nominated as a candidate at a police and crime commissioner election taking place on the same day for a different police area.
 Anyone who is not a British, European Union or qualifying Commonwealth citizen. (A qualifying Commonwealth citizen is a Commonwealth citizen who either does not need leave to enter or remain or has indefinite leave to remain in the UK.)
 Anyone who has ever been convicted of an imprisonable offence. This applies even if they were not actually imprisoned, or if the conviction is "spent".  
 Anyone who is a police officer or is directly or indirectly employed by the police.
 Anyone who is disqualified under certain provisions of the House of Commons Disqualification Act 1975 including civil servants, members of the regular armed forces or the holders of any judicial offices specified in Part 1 of Schedule 1 of the House of Commons Disqualification Act 1975 (as amended).
 Anyone who is a member of the legislature of any country or territory outside the UK.
 Anyone who is a member of staff of a local council that falls wholly or partly within the police area in which the election is to be held - including anyone employed in an organisation that is under the control of a local council in the police area for which the election is to be held.
 Anyone who is the subject of a debt relief order or interim order, a bankruptcy restrictions order or interim order, or a debt relief restrictions undertaking. 
 Anyone who is disqualified under the Representation of the People Act 1983 (which covers corrupt or illegal electoral practices and offences relating to donations) or under the Audit Commission Act 1998.

Candidates must secure the signatures of 100 people registered to vote within the force area in which they wish to stand and must pay a deposit of £5,000. A person with an anonymous entry in the register of electors cannot nominate a candidate for election. The appointed Deputy PCC is held to similar criteria as the PCC. During the COVID-19 pandemic in the United Kingdom the Cabinet Office reduced the number of signatures candidates required (The Mayoral and Police and Crime Commissioner Elections (Coronavirus, Nomination of Candidates) (Amendment) Order 2021) on nomination forms in order to reduce social interaction.

The Association of Police and Crime Commissioners published a candidate briefing prior to the 2021 elections, setting out "Guidance, advice and information for anyone interested in standing as a candidate in the 2021 Police and Crime Commissioner elections."

Jonathon Seed, the Conservative Party candidate for Wiltshire Police and Crime Commissioner in the 2021 election, did not take up his post after it was revealed that he had a past conviction for an imprisonable offence. ITV News had asked Seed, his campaign team and the Conservative Party if Seed had any convictions before polling day. In footage posted online, Seed refused to answer questions put to him by news reporters prior to the election. Wiltshire Police asked Thames Valley Police to investigate and he was charged with making a false declaration. He was due to stand trial in July 2022, but in June the Crown Prosecution Service dropped the charges after a pre-trial review on the grounds of insufficient evidence. The re-run of the election was held in August 2021 and was expected to cost £1million.

Electoral system
Commissioners have a set four-year term of office. There is no limit on the number of terms which a PCC can serve.

Elections use the supplementary vote system: voters mark the ballot paper with their first and second choices of candidate. If no candidate gets a majority of first preference votes, all but the top two candidates are eliminated and the second preference votes of the eliminated candidates are allocated to one of the two remaining (or set aside if no second preference for either) to produce a winner. The Police Reform and Social Responsibility Act 2011 directs that the voting system is first-past-the-post if there are only two candidates for a specific commissioner region.

List
The following is a list of all the police and crime commissioners, .

England

The City of London Police Committee, chaired by James Thomson, oversees the City of London Police.

Wales

Scotland 
In Scotland, the Scottish Police Authority serves in a similar capacity for Police Scotland.

Northern Ireland 
In Northern Ireland, the Northern Ireland Policing Board fulfils a similar role for the Police Service of Northern Ireland.

Non-geographic authorities 
The British Transport Police Authority, Ministry of Defence Police Committee and Civil Nuclear Police Authority oversee the British Transport Police, Ministry of Defence Police and Civil Nuclear Constabulary, respectively.

Elections

2012 elections

2016 elections

2021 elections

Criticism 
Issues have included conflict between PCCs and chief constables, questions over PCC expenses, the cost of elections and low voter turnout (in some cases, below 15%). The Plain English Campaign described the commissioners in 2015 as "serial offenders" in "mangling of the English language" and the use of "jargon". The former Home Secretary Theresa May, who introduced the directly elected commissioners, in 2014, considered the policy to have had mixed success.

Possible abolition 
In 2014, the Liberal Democrats indicated that they would scrap the positions. In light of this, the Liberal Democrats boycotted the 2014 South Yorkshire PCC by-election.

The replacement of some PCCs with directly elected mayors is expected to occur as a result of the Cities and Local Government Devolution Act 2016. In 2017, the Greater Manchester Police and Crime Commissioner was replaced by the Mayor of Greater Manchester and the role of West Yorkshire Police and Crime Commissioner was absorbed by the mayor of West Yorkshire in 2021. In 2019, both the Metro Mayor of the Liverpool City Region and the Mayor of the West Midlands advocated taking over the police and crime commissioner roles in their respective areas.

See also

 Sheriffs in the United States, elected officials also responsible for the administration of law within a given geographic area

Notes

References

Law enforcement in England and Wales